The Beijer Hockey Games (BHG, formerly known as Sweden Hockey Games) is an annual ice hockey tournament held in Sweden and part of the Euro Hockey Tour. It was cancelled after the 2013–14 season. However, on 19 January 2016, the Swedish Ice Hockey Association announced the tournament to be restarted for the 2016–17 season. The tournament was also known as the LG Hockey Games between 2006 and 2011, and the Oddset Hockey Games between 2012 and 2014, while under sponsorship naming rights.

History
The Beijer Hockey Games started in 1991. Since the 1996–97 season, the tournament is part of the Euro Hockey Tour, in which the Czech Republic, Finland, Russia and Sweden participate.

The tournament first operated under a sponsored name in 2006 when LG Electronics changed the name to the LG Hockey Games. In 2012, LG dropped out of their sponsoring and Svenska Spel's gambling game Oddset took over, changing the tournament's name to the Oddset Hockey Games. The Oddset sponsorship ended when the tournament was cancelled following the 2014 Oddset Hockey Games. In 2018 the company Beijer Byggmaterial, Sweden's largest wholly owned DIY store chain, claimed the sponsorship, changing the name to Beijer Hockey Games. In December 2020, the agreement was extended for another three years until 2023.

The event is mainly held in the Ericsson Globe in Stockholm, Sweden, although a few games may exclusively be hosted in other countries. The winner of the tournament receives the Globen Cup, leading to the tournament sometimes being called the Sweden Globen Cup. Typically, only the Czech Republic, Finland, Russia, and Sweden are invited to the tournament, but from the 1991–92 season through the 2002–03 season Canada also participated.

In 2022, Switzerland replaced Russia due to the Russian invasion of Ukraine.

Results
Final standings in each event are determined in a round-robin tournament. If teams are tied in points, the standing is determined by the result of the game between the tied teams.

Medal table

References

External links
 Medal table
 History 
 Archive 

 
Euro Hockey Tour
Ice hockey tournaments in Europe
International ice hockey competitions hosted by Sweden
International sports competitions in Stockholm
1991 establishments in Sweden
Recurring sporting events established in 1991